"All in Red" is the first single by It Bites. It was written by frontman Francis Dunnery and released on 10 March 1986. The single's B-side, "Heartbreaker", can also be found on the Sister Sarah single taken from the album, Eat Me in St. Louis, in 1989.

Track listing 

7" vinyl:
 "All in Red" (7")
 "Heartbreaker"

12" vinyl:
 "All in Red" (Full Length Version)
 "All in Red" (7")
 "Heartbreaker"

References 

1986 debut singles
It Bites songs
1986 songs
Virgin Records singles